Poljane or Polanë (Polana) is a village/settlement in the Istog municipality, Kosovo.

36 Serb families lived in the village of Poljane before the 1999 war. In the war, the Serbs got displaced and in the subsequent decade their land got usurped. The forests there have also been burned.

On June 3, 2010, eight Serbs returned after 11 years.

Population

Notes

References

Villages in Istog